nila northSun is a Native American poet and tribal historian.

northSun's gritty, realistic poems about life both on and off the reservation have made her one of the most widely read of all Native American poets.

She is often considered an influential writer in the second wave of the Native American Renaissance.

Background
northSun was born in 1951 in Schurz, Nevada to a Shoshone mother and a Chippewa father, Native American activist Adam Fortunate Eagle.

Raised in the San Francisco Bay Area, she is a graduate of the University of Montana-Missoula.

northSun uses colloquial "Reservation English," irony, and humor to explore themes of alienation, disenfranchisement, anger, loss, and brutalization.

She lives on the Fallon Paiute-Shoshone Reservation in Fallon, Nevada and works as a grant writer for the Reno-Sparks Indian Colony.

Recognition and honors 
In 2000, the "Friends of the Library" group at the University of Nevada honored her with the Silver Pen Award for outstanding literary achievement. Governor Kenny Guinn appointed her to the Nevada State Arts Council that same year.

In 2004, she received the "Indigenous Heritage Award in Literature" from ATAYL, an international agency and is the recipient of a Sierra Arts Foundation Literary Award.

Selected works

Poetry
whipped cream and sushi (2008)
Love at gunpoint (2007)
A snake in her mouth: poems 1974–96 (1997)
Small bones, little eyes: poems (1981) (with Jim Sagel)
Coffee, dust devils and old rodeo bulls: poems (1979) (with first husband Kirk Robertson)
Diet pepsi and nacho cheese: poems (1977)

Non-fiction
After the Drying Up of the Water, a tribal history of the Fallon Paiute-Shoshone (1980)

See also

List of writers from peoples indigenous to the Americas
Native American Studies

References

External links
 The Internet Public Library Native American Authors Project

1951 births
Living people
Ojibwe people
Native American poets
Poets from Nevada
Shoshone people
People from Mineral County, Nevada
People from Fallon, Nevada
University of Montana alumni
American women poets
20th-century American poets
20th-century American women writers
21st-century American poets
21st-century American women writers
Native American women writers
21st-century Native American women
21st-century Native Americans
20th-century Native American women
20th-century Native Americans